Clube Desportivo Portosantense is a Rink Hockey team from Porto Santo, Madeira, Portugal. It  stayed in 5th in the 2005-06 Portuguese Championship.

Current Squad 2006/07

Rink hockey clubs in Portugal